The Mozarteum Argentino is a private, non-profit musical institution in Argentina. It is an important musical institution in the country and provides scholarships to some of Argentina's most able musicians. The Mozarteum Argentino was established in 1952 and also organizes concerts, often over 50 a year.

References

External links
Official site
 Mozarteum Argentino Facebook Page

Music schools in Argentina
Educational institutions established in 1952
1952 establishments in Argentina